Volodymyr Apatsky (*29 August  1928, Minsk) — Ukrainian bassoonist, teacher, professor of the National music academy in Kyiv, the capital of Ukraine.
He was principal bassoonist for the Kyiv theater of opera and ballet symphony orchestra until 1981, 
second prize winner of the contest of the Belarusian musicians-performers on wind instruments (1952), Winner (and premiums) Soviet All-Union Festival of Youth (1957).

External links
 http://radomysl.blog.cz/0712
 http://academia.gov.ua/sites/Apatskyj/Apatskyj.htm

Sources
S. Bolotin — Glossary of musicians-performers on wind instruments

1928 births
Living people
Musicians from Minsk
Ukrainian classical bassoonists
21st-century Ukrainian musicians
20th-century Ukrainian musicians